This is a list of English and Spanish language placenames in the Falkland Islands.  Most of the Spanish language names are quite different in origin to their English equivalents, and many have religious resonances.  Some names were given by the Spanish conquistadores, while others were given later by the Argentine government.

The Spanish names are almost never used by residents of the islands themselves, and some, such as Malvinas and Puerto Argentino, may be considered offensive by them due to their association with the 1982 invasion of the Falkland Islands. Under a declaration issued jointly following the 1999 agreement lifting travel restrictions to the islands, Argentina undertook to review the Argentine place names for Falkland Island locations, imposed under decree by General Galtieri.  However, to date, Argentina still continues to use these placenames to the frustration of the islanders. Many are not generally in use as Spanish names, rather they are names conferred by an Argentine Government committee where there is no Spanish language equivalent.

The Falkland Islands take their name from the Falkland Sound, a strait separating the archipelago's two main islands. The name "Falkland" was applied to the channel by John Strong, captain of an English expedition, which landed on the islands in 1690. Strong named the strait in honour of Anthony Cary, 5th Viscount of Falkland, the Treasurer of the Navy who sponsored their journey. The Viscount's title originates from the town of Falkland, Scotland, whose name comes from "folkland" (land held by folk-right). The name was not applied to the islands until 1765, when British captain John Byron of the Royal Navy, claimed them for King George III as "Falkland's Islands". The term "Falklands" is a short name used to refer to the islands.

The Spanish name for the archipelago, Islas Malvinas, derives from the French Îles Malouines — the name given to the islands by French explorer Louis-Antoine de Bougainville in 1764. Bougainville, who founded the islands' first settlement, named the area after the port of Saint-Malo (the point of departure for his ships and colonists). The port, located in the Brittany region of western France, was in turn named after St. Malo (or Maclou), the Christian evangelist who founded the city.

At the twentieth session of the United Nations General Assembly, the Fourth Committee determined that, in all languages other than Spanish, all UN documentation would designate the territory as Falkland Islands (Malvinas). In Spanish, the territory was designated as Islas Malvinas (Falkland Islands). The nomenclature used by the United Nations for statistical processing purposes is Falkland Islands (Malvinas).

A few names have the same form in both English and Spanish; for example Darwin, San Carlos, Salvador and Rincon Grande.

Maps

Names of islands

Names of settlements

Land features

Marine features

See also
 List of settlements in the Falkland Islands
 Sovereignty of the Falkland Islands

References

External links
 
 Official report from the British government, includes a bilingual list of place-names.

 Official list of placenames (Spanish only) from the Argentine government.
 Detailed map in English
 Detailed map in Spanish

placenames
Lists of place names
Geographical naming disputes